Kangasniemi is a municipality in the Southern Savonia region, Finland.

Its neighbour municipalities are Hankasalmi, Hirvensalmi, Joutsa, Mikkeli, Pieksämäki and Toivakka.

There are almost 3600 (May 2014) summer houses, and summer guests redouble the number of inhabitants during the summer months.

The municipality is unilingually Finnish.

History
The municipality was founded in 1867.

Nature
The largest lakes are Puulavesi and Kyyvesi. Some other lakes are Mallos and Synsiä. In 1997, Kangasniemi was voted the most beautiful municipality in Finland by television show.

Economy
There is also Puula golf field.

Famous natives
Emilie Björkstén, poet
Hilding Ekelund, architect
Otto Manninen, writer, poet and translator
Tepa Reinikainen, shot putter
Hiski Salomaa, singer and songwriter
Virpi Sarasvuo, née Kuitunen, cross-country skier
Sami Sarjula, actor
Martti Tolamo, athlete

Gallery

See also
Kangasniemi Church

References

External links

Municipality of Kangasniemi – Official website
The Finnish Association for Persons with Intellectual Disabilities Official website

 
Populated places established in 1867